Players and pairs who neither have high enough rankings nor receive wild cards may participate in a qualifying tournament held one week before the annual Wimbledon Tennis Championships.

Seeds

  Sergiy Stakhovsky (first round)
  Simon Greul (qualified)
  Flavio Cipolla (second round)
  Roko Karanušić (qualified)
  Rui Machado (second round)
  Thiago Alves (qualifying competition, lucky loser)
  Ilija Bozoljac (second round)
  Horacio Zeballos (second round)
  Danai Udomchoke (qualifying competition, lucky loser)
  Daniel Brands (second round)
  Pablo Cuevas (qualifying competition, lucky loser)
  Mikhail Elgin (first round)
  Adrian Mannarino (qualified)
  Somdev Devvarman (first round)
  Łukasz Kubot (first round)
  Jesse Levine (qualified)
  Olivier Rochus (first round)
  Lamine Ouahab (first round)
  Santiago Giraldo (first round)
  Chris Guccione (first round)
  Brendan Evans (second round)
  Lukáš Rosol (first round)
  Pere Riba (second round)
  Karol Beck (qualifying competition, lucky loser)
  Ricardo Hocevar (second round)
  Olivier Patience (first round)
  Tomas Tenconi (first round)
  Prakash Amritraj (qualifying competition)
  Juan Pablo Brzezicki (second round)
  Alexandre Sidorenko (first round)
  Dominik Hrbatý (second round)
  Donald Young (first round)

Qualifiers

  Rajeev Ram
  Simon Greul
  Xavier Malisse
  Roko Karanušić
  Lukáš Lacko
  Alexander Peya
  Alejandro Falla
  Édouard Roger-Vasselin
  Grega Žemlja
  Santiago González
  Taylor Dent
  Riccardo Ghedin
  Adrian Mannarino
  Luka Gregorc
  Michael Yani
  Jesse Levine

Lucky losers

  Karol Beck
  Thiago Alves
  Danai Udomchoke
  Pablo Cuevas

Qualifying draw

First qualifier

Second qualifier

Third qualifier

Fourth qualifier

Fifth qualifier

Sixth qualifier

Seventh qualifier

Eighth qualifier

Ninth qualifier

Tenth qualifier

Eleventh qualifier

Twelfth qualifier

Thirteenth qualifier

Fourteenth qualifier

Fifteenth qualifier

Sixteenth qualifier

External links

 2009 Wimbledon Championships – Men's draws and results at the International Tennis Federation

Men's Singles Qualifying
Wimbledon Championship by year – Men's singles qualifying